Tom Edward Hammonds (born March 27, 1967) is an American former professional basketball player and National Hot Rod Association drag racer. He was born in Fort Walton Beach, Florida, and attended Crestview High School in Crestview, Florida.

Hammonds played college basketball at Georgia Institute of Technology, earning Rookie of the Year honors in the Atlantic Coast Conference in 1986. After graduating in 1989, he was selected by the Washington Bullets in the first round (ninth overall) in the 1989 NBA Draft. He played 12 NBA seasons for the Bullets, Denver Nuggets, Charlotte Hornets and Minnesota Timberwolves, averaging 5.3 points per game in his career. He scored a career-high 31 points for the Bullets against the New York Knicks, on January 29, 1992.

While enrolled at Georgia Tech, Hammonds played for the US national team in the 1986 FIBA World Championship, winning the gold medal.

While playing for the Nuggets, Hammonds became involved in drag racing. He qualified in the 1996 Mopar Parts Mile High Nationals, only to lose to Kurt Johnson. He owns his own NHRA team, racing in the NHRA's Pro Stock class since 1996.

Hammonds also opened a car dealership in Darlington, South Carolina.

Notes

External links

NBA.com profile
DRAG RACING: Former NBA Player Now Working Hard In NHRA

1967 births
Living people
African-American basketball players
All-American college men's basketball players
American automobile salespeople
American men's basketball players
Basketball players from Florida
Charlotte Hornets players
Denver Nuggets players
Dragster drivers
FIBA World Championship-winning players
Georgia Tech Yellow Jackets men's basketball players
McDonald's High School All-Americans
Minnesota Timberwolves players
Parade High School All-Americans (boys' basketball)
People from Fort Walton Beach, Florida
Power forwards (basketball)
United States men's national basketball team players
Washington Bullets draft picks
Washington Bullets players
1986 FIBA World Championship players
Competitors at the 1986 Goodwill Games
21st-century African-American people
20th-century African-American sportspeople